Boussad Houche (born 5 April 1978) is a former professional footballer who played as a defensive midfielder or centre-back.

Career
Houche was born in Revin, France. After bouncing around several amateur clubs including Olympique de Charleville-Mézières, Revin and Rethel in France, and RES Couvin-Mariembourg in Belgium, he joined Stade Reims in 2002. In his first season with the club, Houche played with the reserve side. In his second season, he was a member of the first team which was playing in the Championnat National, making 8 appearances and helping the team gain promotion to Ligue 2. He went on to make another 21 appearances for the club in Ligue 2 before leaving in 2005.

In the summer of 2005, Houche signed with APEP Pitsilia in the Cypriot First Division. He spent just one season with the club before returning to Belgium to play with RES Couvin-Mariembourg.

He played for IFK Mariehamn in the Veikkausliiga, having spent the 2008–09 season playing as a defender for AC Oulu in the Finnish Ykkönen.

References

External links
 

1978 births
Living people
Association football midfielders
Association football defenders
Algerian footballers
Algerian expatriate footballers
French footballers
French expatriate footballers
French sportspeople of Algerian descent
Ligue 2 players
Cypriot First Division players
Veikkausliiga players
OFC Charleville players
Stade de Reims players
APEP FC players
AC Oulu players
IFK Mariehamn players
MFK Topvar Topoľčany players
Expatriate footballers in Cyprus
Expatriate footballers in Finland
Expatriate footballers in Belgium
Algerian expatriate sportspeople in Belgium
Algerian expatriate sportspeople in Finland
Algerian expatriate sportspeople in Cyprus